The women's 50 metre breaststroke competition of the swimming events at the 2011 World Aquatics Championships was held on July 30 with the heats and the semifinals and July 31 with the final.

Records
Prior to the competition, the existing world and championship records were as follows.

Results

Heats
36 swimmers participated in 5 heats.

Semifinals
The semifinals were held at 18:16.

Semifinal 1

Semifinal 2

Final
The final was held at 18:02.

References

External links
2011 World Aquatics Championships: Women's 50 metre breaststroke start list, from OmegaTiming.com; retrieved 2011-07-23.

Breaststroke 050 metre, women's
World Aquatics Championships
2011 in women's swimming